The Quiet Earth is a 1985 New Zealand post-apocalyptic science fiction film directed by Geoff Murphy and starring Bruno Lawrence, Alison Routledge and Peter Smith as three survivors of a cataclysmic disaster. It is loosely based on the 1981 science fiction novel of the same name by Craig Harrison. Other sources of inspiration have been suggested: the 1954 novel I Am Legend, Dawn of the Dead, and especially the 1959 film The World, the Flesh and the Devil, of which it has been called an unofficial remake.

Plot
July 5 begins as a normal winter morning near Hamilton, New Zealand. At 6:12 a.m., the sun darkens for a moment, and a red light surrounded by darkness is briefly seen.

Zac Hobson is a scientist employed by Delenco, part of a United States-led international consortium working on "Project Flashlight" – an experiment to create a wireless global energy grid to power military equipment. He awakens abruptly; when he turns on his radio, he is unable to receive any transmissions. He drives into the city, which he finds deserted. Investigating a fire, he discovers the burning wreckage of a passenger jet, but there are no bodies, only empty seats. Every living animal and human appears to have vanished between the ticks of a clock.

Zac enters his laboratory, but fails to contact any of the other labs around the world. In an underground lab, he discovers the dead body of Perrin, his superior, at the primary Flashlight Grid control panel; a monitor displays the message "Operation Flashlight Complete". The mass disappearance seems to coincide with the moment Flashlight was activated. The lab is suddenly and automatically sealed because of radiation, so he improvises a gas bomb to escape. He listens to his own voice on a tape recorder describing the project as having "phenomenal destructive potential", then notes: "Zac Hobson, July 5th. One: there has been a malfunction in Project Flashlight with devastating results. Two: it seems I am the only person left on Earth." He refers to the phenomenon as "The Effect".

After a week of trying to contact another human being, Zac moves into a mansion. His mental state begins to deteriorate. He puts on a woman's nightgown and alternates between exhilaration and despair. He assembles cardboard cutouts of famous people (including Adolf Hitler, Elizabeth II, and Pope John Paul II), plays a loud fanfare and cheers from large speakers, and addresses the cutouts from a balcony. He declares himself "President of this Quiet Earth", then goes on a destructive rampage after the power blacks out. He bursts into a church, shoots a statue of Jesus off a crucifix, and announces that he is God. After accidentally crushing an empty pram with an enormous earthmover, he puts the barrel of a shotgun into his mouth, but desists. This event serves to break his insanity.

Zac settles into a more normal routine. One morning, a young woman named Joanne appears. Zac is attracted to her, and after a few days they have sex. They find a third survivor, a Māori man named Api. The three determine why they survived: at the instant of The Effect, they were all at the moment of death: Api was being drowned during a fight, Joanne was electrocuted by a faulty hairdryer, and Zac had overdosed on pills in a suicide attempt. He had realized the experiment posed serious dangers and was guilt-ridden for not speaking out. The discovery of his body, with his lab ID and tape recorder nearby, would have the consequence of exposing Project Flashlight and ending the experiment before it was too late.

A love triangle develops, but Zac is more concerned about his scientific observations: universal physical constants are changing, causing the Sun's output to fluctuate and become highly unstable. Zac fears The Effect will occur again (and that the Sun will soon collapse in any case and obliterate the Earth) and decides to destroy the Delenco facility. Api has provided the possible answer – if the still-active Flashlight Grid is balanced, and is continually destabilizing the Sun, then knocking out the facility would make the Grid fail. The three put aside their personal conflicts and drive a truckload of explosives to the installation, only to be stopped at the perimeter when Zac detects dangerous levels of ionising radiation emanating from the plant. He says that he will go to town to retrieve a remote control device to send the truck into the facility.

While Zac is gone, Joanne and Api have sex. Afterward, Api tells Joanne that he will sacrifice himself by driving the truck; he doubts that Zac's device will be capable of controlling the vehicle. They then hear the truck. Zac has not returned to town and drives the truck onto the gas-bomb-weakened roof of the laboratory, which caves in. Just as the Second Effect occurs, he triggers the explosives.

Once again, a bright red light is seen surrounded by a dark tunnel. Zac awakens on a beach at twilight. There are strange cloud formations, resembling waterspouts, rising out of the ocean. He walks to the water's edge, then sees an enormous ringed planet slowly rise over the horizon. As the only survivor of this new Effect (and holding his tape recorder), Zac stares in confusion and despair at his unearthly surroundings.

Cast
 Bruno Lawrence as Zac Hobson
 Alison Routledge as Joanne
 Pete Smith as Api

Analysis
The precise meaning of the final scene is left to the audience. In his commentary on the Umbrella Entertainment DVD release, writer/producer Sam Pillsbury states, "...we all thought it was quite simple; I mean, our intention was just that, what happened was, he died at the moment of the effect for a second time and he's now found himself in another world, what the hell's he gonna do...", he then says, more or less jokingly, that director Geoff Murphy being "a Catholic or lapsed Catholic, [it] may well have been something to do with purgatory, and y'know, you being trapped in cyclical and going back into having to relive your thing until you work out your karma, [something; possibly 'if I'm not'] mixing my metaphors; anyway, enigmatic is good, I think, to a certain extent..."

Reception
Walter Goodman of The New York Times wrote, "...it's easy to watch most of the time and never positively painful."  Variety wrote, "One of New Zealand's top directors, Geoff Murphy has taken a man-alone theme and turned it imaginatively to strong and refreshing effect in The Quiet Earth." Sheila Benson of the Los Angeles Times called Lawrence's screen presence "electrifying".

It has since become a cult film. In 2014, astrophysicist Neil deGrasse Tyson named it one of his favorite science fiction films. The film placed tenth in a 2014 public poll by Stuff.co.nz of the best New Zealand films of all time.

References

External links
 
 
 
 

1980s New Zealand films
1980s disaster films
1985 independent films
1980s science fiction films
1985 films
1980s dystopian films
New Zealand science fiction films
New Zealand independent films
New Zealand post-apocalyptic films
Films based on British novels
Films based on New Zealand novels
Films based on science fiction novels
Films directed by Geoff Murphy
Films set in New Zealand
Films shot in New Zealand
1980s English-language films